Berzo San Fermo is a comune in the province of Bergamo, in Lombardy.

Bounding comuni

Grone
Adrara San Martino
Foresto Sparso 
Entratico
Borgo di Terzo
Vigano San Martino

Coat of arms

The coat of arms shows a tree, a cow and a blue star on a yellow background.

References